There have been two Baronetcies created for persons with the surname Hickman, one in the Baronetage of England and one in the Baronetage of the United Kingdom.

The Hickman Baronetcy, of Gainsborough in the County of Lincoln, was created in the Baronetage of England on 16 November 1643 for Willoughby Hickman. The second Baronet represented East Retford in the House of Commons. The third Baronet sat as member of parliament for Kingston upon Hull, East Retford and Lincolnshire. The title became extinct on the death of the fifth Baronet in 1781.

The Hickman Baronetcy, of Wightwick in the parish of Tettenhall in the County of Stafford, was created in the Baronetage of the United Kingdom on 25 August 1903 for the iron and steel manufacturer Alfred Hickman. He also represented Wolverhampton in the House of Commons as a Conservative.

Hickman baronets, of Gainsborough (1643)

Sir Willoughby Hickman, 1st Baronet (1604–1650)
Sir William Hickman, 2nd Baronet (1629–1682)
Sir Willoughby Hickman, 3rd Baronet (1659–1720)
Sir Nevile Hickman, 4th Baronet (1701–1733)
Sir Nevile George Hickman, 5th Baronet (died 1781)

Hickman baronets, of Wightwick (1903)

Sir Alfred Hickman, 1st Baronet (1830–1910)
Sir Alfred Edward Hickman, 2nd Baronet (1885–1947)
Sir (Alfred) Howard Whitby Hickman, 3rd Baronet (1920–1979)
Sir (Richard) Glenn Hickman, 4th Baronet (born 1949)

The heir apparent is the present holder's son Charles Patrick Alfred Hickman (born 1983).

References

Kidd, Charles, Williamson, David (editors). Debrett's Peerage and Baronetage (1990 edition). New York: St Martin's Press, 1990.

Baronetcies in the Baronetage of the United Kingdom
Extinct baronetcies in the Baronetage of England